Calanus propinquus is a copepod found in Antarctica, and the surrounding waters.

Description

Distribution
C. propinquus is found off Antarctica, southern Africa, and southern South America.

Ecology

Life cycle and reproduction
Reproduction occurs from October to March. In February, the population of C. propinquus greatly increases. During this time, the population is mostly concentrated in the top  of the sea. Most of these copepodites, however, stay at the surface, overwintering in an active state.

The lipid content of this species changes throughout its lifecycle. The highest concentration of lipids are found in adults, with lipids making up about 40%, on average, of the dry weight of females during the summer. It has the highest lipid content during the autumn, and the lowest during the spring. These stores decrease as its gonads develop. Most of the accumulated lipids are triglycerides, contrasting with other calanoid copepods that primarily use wax esters. This is partially achieved through the elongation of 11-Eicosenoic acid into erucic acid, which serves to concentrate the energy found. C. propinquue primarily uses triglycerides likely because most individuals are active during winter. The percentage of lipids that are triglycerides increases as the copepod ages; about 42% of the lipids in stage II copepodites are triglycerides, whereas in females, this increases to about 91% of the total lipid content.

References

Calanoida
Crustaceans described in 1883